Malcolm Alker (born 4 November 1978) is an English former professional rugby league footballer who played as a . He spent his entire professional career with the Salford City Reds, making over 350 appearances between 1997 and 2010. He also served as the club's captain for many years.

Background
Malcolm Alker was born in Wigan, Greater Manchester, England.

Career
Alker started his junior career with Orrell St James before moving to Wigan St Patricks. He joined the Salford Reds in May 1997, and he made his début later that year against the Sheffield Eagles.

In 2000, Alker captained Salford City Reds for the first time at the age of 21 in the absence of regular captain Darren Brown.

Alker played his entire professional rugby league career at Salford City Reds. He has represented Lancashire and England.

In January 2009, Alker was stripped of the club captaincy following a breach of club rules during their pre-season training camp in Jacksonville, Florida. He was re-appointed as captain two months later.

In August 2010, Alker announced that he would be retiring at the end of the season, but would remain at the club in a coaching role.

In March 2011, it was announced that head coach Shaun McRae would be taking sick leave, with Alker jointly taking charge of coaching duties alongside fellow assistant Phil Veivers and Director of Football Steve Simms during his absence. In April 2011, Alker filed a complaint against Salford after being dismissed from a training session. After failing to come to an agreement, the club announced that Alker would be "taking time away from the club to undergo surgery on his neck".

Testimonial match
Alker reached his testimonial year with Salford City Reds in 2006. His testimonial match took place during the 2007 pre-season against the Wigan Warriors, which the Warriors won 20–15.

Personal life
In 2012, Alker released his autobiography, The Devil Within. In the book, Alker admitted use of cocaine and banned growth hormones during his playing days.

Alker was sentenced to four years imprisonment on 12 January 2018 for the armed robbery of a KFC restaurant and a Tesco Express store in Wigan on 31 October 2017.

References

External links
(archived by web.archive.org) Salford profile
Super League profile
 ĎŔƑ "My life in rugby league: Malcolm Alker" interview at TotalRL.com
Statistics at rugbyleagueproject.org

1978 births
Living people
21st-century English criminals
England national rugby league team players
English rugby league players
Lancashire rugby league team players
Rugby league players from Wigan
Rugby league hookers
Salford Red Devils captains
Salford Red Devils players
Wigan St Patricks players